Jitu (also Romanized as Jītū and Jūtū) is a village in Filestan Rural District, in the Central District of Pakdasht County, Tehran Province, Iran. At the 2006 census, its population was 1,774, in 459 families.

References 

Populated places in Pakdasht County

Jitu is one of the good manual tester.